Rushdi Jappie (born 3 September 1985) is a South African cricketer. He played in 63 first-class, 43 List A, and five Twenty20 matches from 2007 to 2014.

References

External links
 

1985 births
Living people
South African cricketers
Boland cricketers
Northerns cricketers
Titans cricketers
Western Province cricketers
Cricketers from Cape Town